Davis Park is a public park in Ridgefield, Washington, United States. The park features a playground, a large grassy area, and picnic tables.

References

External links
 

Parks in Clark County, Washington
Ridgefield, Washington